Drum Corps International (DCI) is a governing body for junior drum and bugle corps responsible for developing and enforcing rules of competition, and for providing standardized adjudication at sanctioned drum and bugle corps competitions throughout the United States and Canada. DCI is based in Indianapolis, Indiana.

The competitive season traditionally begins in late June and ends with the annual World Championship the second week of August. In March 2020, DCI announced the upcoming competitive season would be cancelled, in response to the ongoing COVID-19 pandemic.

DCI is not affiliated with the similarly named Drum Corps Associates (DCA) or Drum Corps Europe (DCE), governing bodies for all-age or senior drum and bugle corps in the United States and Europe.

History 
In 1971, at the urging of then-director of The Cavaliers, Don Warren, and Troopers director, Jim Jones, the directors from Blue Stars, Madison Scouts, and Santa Clara Vanguard, partnered with each other to form what was called the "Midwest Combine". The Combine corps would market themselves to show promoters as a package. This partnership was a reaction to perceived inflexibility of the American Legion and VFW, who were then the primary sponsors of competing drum corps as well as the hosts of the only high-prestige national championships. Another source of contention was low-to-nonexistent appearance fees paid to independent corps who were neither sponsored nor affiliated with any veterans post. Only those independent corps who placed among the top three at either of the national championships were paid any appearance fees, which deterred many corps from competing. Additionally, many local show sponsors and promoters rarely paid appearance fees to any corps. A similar combine had formed corps based in the Northeast, known as the Alliance. Its members were: 27th Lancers, Garfield Cadets, Boston Crusaders, Blessed Sacrament Golden Knights, and Blue Rock. Despite objections from veterans associations, and boycotts by adjudicators, both the Combine and the Alliance remained intact for the 1971 competitive season. After discussions during the VFW National Championships, the members of both groups agreed to meet at the next American Legion Uniformed Group Rules Congress to discuss forming a new, independent, governing body. Also invited to the meeting were the Anaheim Kingsmen, Argonne Rebels, and De La Salle Oaklands. Drum Corps International was established by thirteen corps on or after October 21, 1971.

Given the difficulties experienced during the 1971 season, the members agreed not to interfere with the long-established regional competition circuits, especially those sponsored by the veterans organizations, but to boycott the other prestige championships, such as the Fleetwood Record's World Open Championship. The members also agreed to develop their own adjudicators committee instead of relying on any existing association. Additionally, member corps would be allowed to compete where they wished with few exceptions. However, all member corps would be required to attend a specific number of sanctioned competitions as well as an annual World Championship which would be scheduled in late-August after the other championships. Members also agreed to remain united if boycotting a particular event, show sponsor, or business, such as the boycott against Fleetwood Records over rights issues, if such an action proved necessary. The first World Championship was hosted at Warhawks Stadium on the campus of University of Wisconsin–Whitewater on August 18, 1972. In attendance were thirty-nine corps from fifteen states and one Canadian province. The Anaheim Kingsmen Drum and Bugle Corps was named the inaugural DCI World Champion.

Following the creation of DCI, the Combine evolved into Drum Corps Midwest (DCM), while the Alliance became Drum Corps East—sometimes called Drum Corps Atlantic. Both DCM and Drum Corps East offered a regional circuit of competitions and a regional championship prior to the "national tour" of sanctioned competitions. DCI gradually expanded its schedule to begin earlier in the competitive season, and thus participation declined at non-sanctioned competitions. Many of the regional circuits which pre-dated DCI, continued into the 1990s, with their high-profile competitions eventually being replaced by sanctioned competitions. Other high-prestige championships, were eventually absorbed into the DCI schedule, many becoming regional championships or annual events such as the Eastern Classic at J. Birney Crum Stadium, or the U.S. Open in Marion, Ohio. VFW Nationals and the American Legion National Championships are no longer hosted. American Legion and VFW posts in the Midwest or New England continue to host drum corps competitions as fundraising events, some of which are sanctioned by DCI. 

On March 25, 2020, in response to the coronavirus pandemic, member corps voted unanimously to cancel the 2020 competitive season.

About 
DCI is a 501(c)(3) organization governed by a board of directors, with an executive director responsible for day-to-day operations. The board of directors is composed of three representatives who are directors of member corps, and three at-large members who are not affiliated with any corps. The current chair of the board of directors is Kathy Black, and the current Executive Director is Dan Acheson.

Drum Corps Associates (DCA), a governing body for all-age or senior drum corps, is not affiliated with DCI, however the two organizations are strategic partners. DCI describes all-age corps as providing value to the drum corps activity, and permits all age corps to compete at sanctioned competitions.

Mission 
As the self-styled "Marching Music's Major League", DCI's mission is to create an environment for participating corps "to engage in education, competition, entertainment, and the promotion of individual growth." The organization also emphasizes positive life-transforming experiences for all participants.

Membership 
To become a DCI member, or to maintain membership, a corps must pass an evaluation by the board of directors. The evaluation requires corps to submit data on their financial health, fundraising capacity and income, participants, staffing, and explanations of their administrative structure. All corps are required to be tax-exempt organizations.

Once approved by the board, a new corps must achieve certain competitive requirements, such as attending World Championships. The corps must then be approved by a majority of other members at a meeting following World Championships, usually the annual rules congress later in the year.

All-age corps are ineligible for membership, but they may qualify as "touring" corps during a competitive season. International corps, or corps based outside the United States and Canada, are also ineligible for membership. However, an international corps that adopts DCI's regulations, specifically instrumentation and participant age limits, may also qualify as a touring corps in either Open or World Class.

Age limit 
DCI limits the age of participants to "21 years of age and younger." A participant who is 22 years before June 1 would be unable to compete. Some European and Asian drum corps associations have no age limit. Corps from those associations are allowed to compete at sanctioned competitions, and at World Championships in International Class.

Due to the cancellation of the 2020 DCI season caused by the COVID-19 pandemic, DCI extended their age-out limit by one year for the 2021 DCI season, making the age limit of participants to 22 years of age and younger. A 23 year old would also be eligible to march in 2021 if they were born on or after June 1. Member corps are allowed to set their own age limit to be younger than 21.

Marketing and broadcasts 
Individual drum corps derive a large part of their revenues from marketing their product, specifically memorabilia and souvenir sales. DCI derives income from ticket sales, and is the sole distributor of official media, such as championship DVDs and audio CDs. DCI is also the exclusive producer of all broadcasts of sanctioned competitions, including online streaming. Edited versions of World Championship Open Class finals were televised by PBS from 1975 until 2004. From 2005 to 2007, a two-hour highlights program of World Championship Division I finals was broadcast by ESPN2.

Since 2004, World Championship World Class prelims have been broadcast to movie theaters by Fathom Events under the title Big, Loud & Live. In 2011, Fathom Events added the DCI Tour Premiere. DCI previously livestreamed a number of competitions throughout the season, including the entirety of World Championship, via the former "DCI FanNetwork". FloSports engaged in a multi-year agreement to livestream select competitions via the  platform. Frequent hosts of the broadcasts and streaming events include former WWAY news anchor Steve Rondinaro, and percussionist Dennis DeLucia.

Other programs 
In 2013, DCI launched two new competitive musical activities for small groups: SoundSport and DrumLine Battle. These activities are not restricted by an age limit, nor do they have the same competitive requirements as drum corps. BANDtastic! began in 2014.

SoundSport 
The stated goal of SoundSport is to provide a competitive performance experience in a low-cost, local setting. Musical ensembles of more than five members, using any musical instruments, perform a 5-7 minute marching music show in an area measuring  × .

Two SoundSport teams Guardians and Watchmen became Open Class member corps in the 2014. Southwind, inactive from 2007 to 2013, competed as a SoundSport team in 2014, and returned to competition as an Open Class member in 2015.

DrumLine Battle 
Intended for drumlines, or battery percussion ensembles with no wheeled percussion. Competing drumlines are staged in two competitive zones opposite each other, with each demonstrating their skills as an ensemble in alternating rounds of two minutes each. Adjudicators do not restrict their evaluation to technical proficiency, and include showmanship and audience reaction.

In 2014, E-Sarn from Thailand, competed in the DrumLine Battle held during World Championship week, defeating fifteen other competitors. River City Rhythm, from Anoka, Minnesota, also competed in 2014, becoming a touring corps in 2015.

BANDtastic! 
BANDtastic is a program of middle school honor bands sponsored by DCI. The program originated in 2013 with the Indiana "INpact" honor band, organized in conjunction with World Championships. Similar groups have since been organized in Georgia, Tennessee, Texas, Florida, and most recently Minnesota.

The activities are held in conjunction with a local DCI competition, and World Class corps partner.

World Championships 

The week-long championship have been hosted at college or professional sports arenas in eighteen U.S cities and Montreal. Since 2009, World Class Championships have been hosted at Lucas Oil Stadium in Indianapolis, Indiana. In 2015, DCI announced World Championships would remain in Indianapolis through 2028. Championships were traditionally held the third week of August. However, the second week of August has been the preferred date due to trends in scholastic and collegiate schedules which pushed the start of the school year from early-September to late-August.

In 2009 and 2010, the Open Class preliminary competition was hosted at Ames Field in Michigan City, Indiana with semifinals and finals hosted a Lucas Oil Stadium. From 2011 to 2018 the Open Class preliminaries and finals were hosted at Ames Field. Open Class Championship was moved to Wildcat Stadium on the campus of Indiana Wesleyan University in Marion, Indiana in 2019.

DrumLine Battle and SoundSport competitions were added to the week's activities in 2014.

Individual & Ensemble (I&E) 
The Individual & ensemble festival, also known as I&E, is also hosted near the championship site. Participants from all member corps are eligible to compete demonstrating their ability on their preferred instrument, or as part of a small ensemble or instrument choir. Color guard and dance categories are also available.

In 2005, I&E was expanded to include woodwind and vocal categories.

Due to the ongoing COVID-19 pandemic, no I&E events took place in the 2022 season.

Active corps

Classification and adjudication 
DCI utilizes a single adjudication handbook with corps subdivided by size, and not skill level. A multi-tier classification and adjudication system was in use prior to 2008, with Division I and Division IIIII utilizing different handbooks, while also being subdivided by size.

Current classes 

Currently, DCI groups corps from the US and Canada into two classes based on competitive level. Corps from Europe, Asia, Latin America, and anywhere other than the US and Canada are grouped into the International Class. Corps from all classes compete together but are ranked separately. In the past, classes have been fully or partially determined by the number of marching members in each corps; at present, all corps may march up to a maximum of one hundred sixty five (165) members.

World Class (formerly Division I) corps are the groups that have chosen to compete at the highest level and have proven to DCI leadership they have the ability to survive at this level both competitively and financially. The higher a corps is ranked at the DCI Championships, the higher the performance fees they will earn for the following season's performances.

Open Class (formerly Divisions II & III) corps are committed to a lesser competitive level and are generally smaller, although several corps have marched with maximum membership. In September 2007, DCI combined the former Divisions II and III into this new class.

International Class is for corps based outside the US and Canada who wish to compete at sanctioned competitions. Corps in this class are allowed to follow the guidelines of their national governing body, such as: no age restrictions, smaller membership requirements, or the use of woodwind instruments. International corps which abide by DCI rules would be eligible to compete as Open or World Class corps.

Historic classes and divisions

Member limits 
 From 1972 to 1992, Open Class corps were limited to 128 members.
 Class A corps generally had 90 or fewer members, however the membership limit was 128.
 All-Girl Class was restricted to girls only; there was no equivalent all-boy class.
 Class A60, and the later Division III, required between 15 and 60 members. Between 2004 and 2007 all Division III corps were required to march between 30 and 60 members.
 From 1992 to 2007, Division II had the same membership limit as Division I, however few corps reach this limit.
 In 2004, the Division I membership limit was increased from 128 to 135.
 The membership limit for World Class, the new Open Class, and International Class was increased to 150 in 2007.
 In 2018, the membership limit per corps was increased to 154.
 In 2022, the membership limit per corps was increased to 165. Due the size of the corps all on-field judges were limited to the sidelines.

Adjudication 
DCI's Adjudication Manual is based on three broad categories, Visual, Music and Effect. Visual and Music categories are further subdivided into three analysis captions. If more than one adjudicator is utilized in any caption, their scores are averaged before being factored. All-age corps may request to be adjudicated using scoring sheets provided by DCA. Many All-age corps may compete exclusively at DCI sanctioned competitions prior to attending the DCA World Championships, which is traditionally hosted on or before Labor Day weekend.

Past champions 
Below is a list of past champions organized by class. DCI realigned its class structure in 1992, and again in 2008. DCI does not record or announce de facto champions.

See also 
 Drum Corps Associates
 Winter Guard International
 Bands of America

Notes

References

External links 
 
 
 

Drum and bugle corps
Organizations established in 1972
Non-profit organizations based in Indianapolis